Homalictus singhalensis, also known as Lasioglossum (Homalictus) singhalensis, is a species of bee in the genus Homalictus, of the family Halictidae. Sometimes, genus Homalictus is placed as a subgenus within the genus Lasioglossum.

References
 https://www.scribd.com/doc/117262646/2/The-Taxonomy-and-Conservation-Status-of-the-Bees
 https://www.academia.edu/7390502/AN_UPDATED_CHECKLIST_OF_BEES_OF_SRI_LANKA_WITH_NEW_RECORDS

Halictidae
Hymenoptera of Asia
Insects of Sri Lanka
Insects described in 1926